Hector Samuel James Hughes (14 August 1887 – 23 June 1970) was a Scottish Labour Party politician.

In his university years in University College Dublin he was a member of the Young Ireland Branch of the United Irish League, which successfully agitated for the land of 'ranchers' or large graziers to be confiscated and redistributed to their tenants.

In the Labour landslide at the 1945 general election, he was elected as Member of Parliament for Aberdeen North. He held the seat through six further general elections, before retiring from the House of Commons at the 1970 general election.

He died in Brighton aged 82, only a month after stepping down from the House of Commons and five days after the 1970 election returned the Conservative Party to power.

Hector was not only an esteemed politician. He fought for women's rights in the suffragette movement as well as the abolition of the death penalty. He was also a published poet and wrote the national anthem for Ghana when they gained their independence.

He was the great-grandfather of Paul and Tonie Walsh among others.

Grandfather of Sylvia Walsh, Denise Casey, Mark Quinn, Clem Quinn and Benita Quinn Ahearne ( Ireland)

Father of Isolde Hughes/ Cazelet ( Actress) and Finny Hughes/McMullan

References

External links
 

1887 births
1970 deaths
Scottish Labour MPs
Members of the Parliament of the United Kingdom for Aberdeen constituencies
UK MPs 1945–1950
UK MPs 1950–1951
UK MPs 1951–1955
UK MPs 1955–1959
UK MPs 1959–1964
UK MPs 1964–1966
UK MPs 1966–1970
People educated at St Andrew's College, Dublin
Alumni of University College Dublin